The Tuscan Republic was a short-lived state declared on February 18, 1849, after Grand Duke Leopold II fled, leading to the suspension of the Grand Duchy of Tuscany. The Republic ended and the Grand Duchy was reinstated on April 12 that year when the municipal council, fearing Austrian invasion, usurped the powers of the assembly and invited the Grand Duke to return.

Notes

States and territories established in 1849
Tuscany
1849 establishments in Italy